The Sludge Press House was an historic wastewater treatment facility building at the Fields Point Sewage Treatment Plant at Fields Point, Rhode Island in Providence, Rhode Island. It was a two-story brick structure, located near the center of the Field's Point facility, just east of the Chemical Building. It housed the facilities used at the end of the treatment process by which remaining solids were dewatered and compressed before final disposal.

The building was listed on the National Register of Historic Places in 1989, at which time it was described as being in deteriorated condition.  It has since been demolished.

See also
National Register of Historic Places listings in Providence, Rhode Island

References

External links

Infrastructure completed in 1901
Industrial buildings and structures on the National Register of Historic Places in Rhode Island
Sewerage infrastructure on the National Register of Historic Places
Buildings and structures in Providence, Rhode Island
Historic American Engineering Record in Rhode Island
National Register of Historic Places in Providence, Rhode Island